Lisa Vollendorf is an American academic and current President of Empire State College, part of the State University of New York (SUNY).  Previously she served as Interim Provost and Chief Academic Officer at the University of Northern Colorado, and as Special Advisor for Academic Planning and Operational Continuity for the California State University system (2020–21), where she provided strategic support related to crisis management and longer-term continuity planning for the nation's largest four-year public education system. 

From 2017-2020, she served as Provost and Executive Vice President of Sonoma State University in Rohnert Park, California. At Sonoma State, Vollendorf led campus strategic planning and implementation while working collaboratively with all stakeholders and campus leadership to create a strategic budgeting framework under Building Our Future @ SSU: Strategic Plan 2025. During this time, Sonoma State pivoted to serve the North Bay region of the San Francisco Bay Area more purposefully by opening its doors wider to transfer students. This shift was part of an overall strategy to help a region ravaged by the 2017 wildfires recover and thrive.

Previously, Vollendorf was Dean of Humanities and the Arts at San José State University (2012-2017), where she led efforts in collaboration with the city of San José to bring the Hammer Theatre to life. Prior to SJSU, she was department chair, senate chair, and professor of Spanish at California State University, Long Beach (2005–12). She began her teaching career at Miami University of Ohio (1995–97) and earned tenure at Wayne State University in Detroit (1997-2005). She received a Ph.D. in Romance Languages from the University of Pennsylvania in 1995, an MA in Spanish and Latin American Literatures from University of Pennsylvania in 1992, and a BA in English and Spanish from Colorado State University in 1990.

Vollendorf is a scholar of sixteenth and seventeenth century women’s cultural history in Iberia and Latin America. She has received grants from the National Endowment for the Humanities, the Mellon Foundation, the Newberry Library, the Huntington Library, and the William Andrews Clark Memorial Library. She has published two monographs, six edited books, and 35 chapters and articles. She is a member of the Modern Language Association and the American Historical Association.

Bibliography
Vollendorf's eight books include: 
 Women Playwrights of Early Modern Spain, Ed. Nieves Romero-Díaz and Lisa Vollendorf. Trans. Harley Erdman (The Other Voice in Early Modern Europe Series, Iter Press and the Arizona Center for Medieval and Renaissance Studies, 2016)
 Approaches to Teaching Cervantes's Don Quixote, Ed. James A. Parr and Lisa Vollendorf (Modern Language Association of America, 2015)
  Theorising the Ibero-American Atlantic, Ed. Harald E. Braun and Lisa Vollendorf (Brill, 2013); * Women, Religion, and the Atlantic World (1600–1800), Ed. Daniella Kostroun and Lisa Vollendorf (University of Toronto Press, July 2009)
 Literatura y feminismo en España: s. XV - XXI, Ed. and coord., Lisa Vollendorf (Barcelona: Icaria Press, February 2006)
 The Lives of Women: A New History of Inquisitional Spain (Vanderbilt University Press, 2005)
 Reclaiming the Body: María de Zayas's Early Modern Feminism (University of North Carolina Studies in Romance Languages and Literatures, University of North Carolina Press, July 2001) 
 Recovering Spain's Feminist Tradition (Publications of the Modern Language Association of America, 2001).

References

Living people
Year of birth missing (living people)
Place of birth missing (living people)
Sonoma State University faculty
American academic administrators
Women academic administrators
San Jose State University faculty
California State University, Long Beach faculty
Wayne State University alumni
Miami University faculty
University of Pennsylvania alumni
Colorado State University alumni
Cultural historians
American women historians
20th-century American historians
21st-century American historians
Women's studies academics
Historians of Latin America
20th-century American women
21st-century American women
Historians from California